In the geologic timescale the Bathonian is an age and stage of the Middle Jurassic. It lasted from approximately 168.3 Ma to around 166.1 Ma (million years ago). The Bathonian Age succeeds the Bajocian Age and precedes the Callovian Age.

Stratigraphic definitions
The Bathonian Stage takes its name from Bath, a spa town in England built on Jurassic limestone (the Latinized form of the town name is Bathonium). The name was introduced in scientific literature by Belgian geologist d'Omalius d'Halloy in 1843. The original type locality was located near Bath. The French palaeontologist Alcide d'Orbigny was in 1852 the first to define the exact length of the stage.

The base of the Bathonian is at the first appearance of ammonite species Parkinsonia (Gonolkites) convergens in the stratigraphic column. The global reference profile for the base of the Bathonian (a GSSP) was ratified as Ravin du Bès, Bas-Auran area, Alpes de Haute Provence, France in 2009. The top of the Bathonian (the base of the Callovian Stage) is at the first appearance of ammonite genus Kepplerites.

In the Tethys domain, the Bathonian contains eight ammonite biozones:
zone of Clydoniceras discus
zone of Hecticoceras retrocostatum
zone of Cadomites bremeri
zone of Morrisiceras morrisi
zone of Tulites subcontractus
zone of Procerites progracilis
zone of Procerites aurigerus
zone of Zigzagiceras zigzag

Rocks of Bathonian age are well developed in Europe: in the northwest and southwest oolite limestones are characteristically associated with coral-bearing, crinoidal and other varieties, and with some beds of clay. In the north and northeast, Russia, etc., clays, sandstones and ferruginous oolites prevail, some of the last being exploited for iron. They occur also in the extreme north of North America and in the Arctic regions, Greenland, Franz Josef Land, etc.; in Africa, Algeria, Tanzania, Madagascar and near the Cape of Good Hope (Enon Beds); in India, Rajputana and Gulf of Kutch, and in South America.

The well-known Caen stone of Normandy and "Hauptrogenstein" of Swabia, as well as the "Eisenkalk" of northwest Germany, and "Klaus-Schichten" of the Austrian Alps, are of Bathonian age.

References

Notes

Literature
 ; 2004: A Geologic Time Scale 2004, Cambridge University Press.
 ; 1843: Précis élémentaire de géologie, Bertrand, Paris.

External links
GeoWhen Database - Bathonian
Jurassic-Cretaceous timescale, at the website of the subcommission for stratigraphic information of the ICS
Stratigraphic chart of the Upper Jurassic, at the website of Norges Network of offshore records of geology and stratigraphy

 
03
Geological ages